Memorial Hall is a station on the Overbrook branch of the Port Authority of Allegheny County's light rail network. It is located in Castle Shannon, Pennsylvania. The station serves primarily as a park and ride center, with 340 spaces available for commuters. A variety of residents also walk directly to the station. The stop's name comes from the nearby VFW post. The Port Authority does not own the parking facility but leases it from the nearby Castle Shannon Volunteer Fire Department, who charged $1.50 a day when the facility opened. Now the cost is $3.00 a day or $50.00 a month.

History
Memorial Hall's exact opening date is unknown, but has been a stop on the Overbrook line since the early days of Pittsburgh Railways Company.  The stop was closed when the Overbrook line was suspended in 1993, and was completely rebuilt and reopened in 2004.

References

External links 
Port Authority T Stations Listings
Station from Google Maps Street View

Port Authority of Allegheny County stations
Railway stations closed in 1993
Railway stations in the United States opened in 2004
Blue Line (Pittsburgh)
Silver Line (Pittsburgh)